Pithora may refer to:

 Pithora, Chhattisgarh, a town in India
 Pithora (painting), an Indian style of painting
 Prithviraja III, an Indian king, also known as Rai Pithora
Qila Rai Pithora, fort in Delhi, India, named after the king
 Pithora Fort, a fort in Uttarakhand India

See also
Prithviraj (disambiguation), alternate rendition of Pithora
 Prithviraj Chauhan (disambiguation)